This is a list of lighthouses in French Guiana.

Lighthouses

See also
 Lists of lighthouses and lightvessels

References

External links

 

French Guiana
Lighthouses
Water transport in French Guiana
Transport buildings and structures in French Guiana